Rogue Warrior may refer to:

 Richard Marcinko (born 1940), former Navy SEAL and best-selling author, nicknamed "Rogue Warrior"
 Rogue Warrior (book), a book by Richard Marcinko
 Rogue Warrior (video game), a video game based on Marcinko's books, formerly Rogue Warrior: Black Razor
 Rogue Warriors, a Chinese esports organization